Rully Rudolf Nere is an Indonesian football head coach who last coached the Indonesia women's national football team.

A player for Persipura Jayapura in the 1980s, Nere was also a part of Indonesia national football team in the same period, including the squad which won the gold medal of 1987 Southeast Asian Games football tournament on home soil, where he laid the assist for the only goal by Ribut Waidi in the final against Malaysia.

Nere was also held the post as Director of PSSI Youth Development from 2003 to 2007.

His son, Mitchell Nere, is a footballer playing for same club he managed, Pro Titan.

Head coaching career
He managed several clubs during his career as a head coach.

On 5 March 2015, Rully Nere appointed by the Football Association of Indonesia as the Indonesia women's national football team coach.

References

1957 births
Living people
Indonesian football managers
Indonesia international footballers
Indonesian footballers
Persipura Jayapura players
Southeast Asian Games silver medalists for Indonesia
Southeast Asian Games bronze medalists for Indonesia
Southeast Asian Games gold medalists for Indonesia
Southeast Asian Games medalists in football
Association football midfielders
Competitors at the 1987 Southeast Asian Games
Sportspeople from Papua
Women's national association football team managers